Elizabeth Chambers (born August 18, 1982) is an American television personality. She is the founder of the Texas-based BIRD Bakery retail chain, and has filmed  holiday cooking on The Cooking Channel, Today, and The Food Network. She had a film role in The Game Plan and appeared in television series Shark and Criminal Minds.

Early life
Elizabeth Chambers was born in San Antonio, Texas. She is the oldest of four children, and her maternal grandmother, Maureen Carnathan, was of British descent and raised in India. She studied journalism at the University of Texas at Austin.

Career
Chambers's first job was as a correspondent at Al Gore's television network, Current TV. She also was a news correspondent for Entertainment Tonight, E! News Now and Access Hollywood. She acted in the film, The Game Plan and in the television shows Criminal Minds, 2 Broke Girls, and Shark. In 2020, she was named to University of Texas - Austin "Outstanding Alumni" list.

Chambers is the proprietor of BIRD Bakery, which opened in San Antonio in 2012 and in Dallas in 2016. Its baked goods are based on recipes from her grandmother's kitchen.

In 2019, two employees of BIRD Bakery, who were apparently acting independently, were charged with the theft of a total of over $120,000 from the business over several years.

Chambers was a guest judge on the Food Network's "Best Baker in America" in June 2019. and on Chopped Sweets for episodes 105 ("Tiny Treats"), 106 ("Tough Cookies") and 107 ("Million Dollar Desserts") in February and March 2020.

In October 2020, Chambers launched Vision Visors, which makes face masks for children.

Advocacy
She has raised money for the San Antonio Food Bank. Chambers' BIRD Bakery also partnered with cancer non-profit Salood, for which she helped design a cookie to benefit pediatric cancer patients. Food that is not sold at BIRD Bakery is boxed and picked up by local non-profits, including churches, fire and police departments, the Fisher House Foundation, and the Polycystic Kidney Disease Foundation.

Personal life

In 2010, Chambers married actor Armie Hammer. They have two children. They separated in July 2020. She resides in the Cayman Islands with their children.

Filmography

Film

Television

References

External links

 

1987 births
20th-century American actresses
21st-century American actresses
Actresses from Los Angeles
American child actresses
American film actresses
American television actresses
Elizabeth
Living people